The elegant feather star (Tropiometra carinata) is a species of crinoid in the family Tropiometridae.

Description
Elegant feather stars may grow to 20 cm in total length. They are variably coloured in yellow to brown and are occasionally variegated in yellow and brown. They have ten long arms with ciliated side branches that taper to a point. They have 20-30 cirri per arm.

Distribution
These animals are found off the South African coast from the Cape Peninsula to Mozambique as well as circumtropically. They are seen  subtidally and down to at least 51m underwater.

Ecology
Elegant feather stars are usually found singly on shallow reefs and are more abundant on deeper reefs. If displaced they may swim using their arms. Commensal organisms such as the myzostomid worm Myzostoma fuscomaculatum (shown in main image) and the crinoid shrimp Hippolyte catagrapha are found on the specimens found in False Bay.

Synonyms
According to the World Register of Marine Species, the following species are synonyms of Tropiometra carinata:
Antedon brasiliensis Carpenter, 1879
Antedon capensis Bell, 1905
Antedon carinata (Lamarck, 1816)
Comatula carinata Lamarck, 1816 (basionym)
Comatula picta Gay, 1854
Tropiometra audouini AH Clark, 1911
Tropiometra carinata audouini (AH Clark, 1911)
Tropiometra carinata carinata (Lamarck, 1816)
Tropiometra carinata clarki (Gislén, 1938)
Tropiometra carinata indica (AH Clark, 1912)
Tropiometra clarki Gislén, 1938
Tropiometra encrinus AH Clark, 1911
Tropiometra indica AH Clark, 1912
Tropiometra picta (Gay, 1854)

References

Tropiometridae
Animals described in 1816